Child Care & Early Education Research Connections (Research Connections) is a joint project of the National Center for Children in Poverty (NCCP) at Columbia University, the Child Care Bureau of the U.S. Department of Health and Human Services, and the Inter-university Consortium for Political and Social Research (ICPSR) at the University of Michigan. Launched in 2004 through a cooperative agreement, Research Connections produces an interdisciplinary, Web-based, relational database of more than 10,000 research documents and public use data sets on topics related to child care and early education. In addition, Research Connections conducts literature reviews, develops and disseminates materials designed to improve child care policy research, provides technical assistance to researchers and policy makers, conducts data analysis workshops, synthesizes findings into policy research briefs, and provides support to the Child Care Policy Research Consortium.

External links
 Child Care & Early Education Research Connections Web site
 National Child Care Information & Technical Assistance Center (NCCIC) Web site

Bibliography
 Research Connections Publications

United States Department of Health and Human Services